The 2019–20 Basketball League of Serbia is the 14th season of the Basketball League of Serbia, the highest professional basketball league in Serbia. Also, it's the 76th national championship played by Serbian clubs inclusive of nation's previous incarnations as Yugoslavia and Serbia & Montenegro.

The regular season began in October 2019 and ended in March 2020. The SuperLeague season was suspended prior to its start due to the COVID-19 pandemic. On 28 May 2020, the League Assembly canceled definitely the season due to the COVID-19 pandemic.

Crvena zvezda mts was the defending champion and as a consequence of the COVID-19 pandemic, the League Assembly decided not to recognize any team as the champion for the season. The SuperLeague season would have been played in April and May 2020. The playoffs would have been played in June 2020.

Teams

Distribution
The following is the access list for this season.

Promotion and relegation 
 Teams promoted from the Second League
 Kolubara LA 2003
 Napredak JKP

 Teams relegated to the Second League
 Beovuk 72
 Spartak

Venues and locations

Personnel and sponsorship

Coaching changes

First League

League table

Serbian clubs in European competitions

See also
List of current Basketball League of Serbia team rosters
2019–20 Second Men's League of Serbia (basketball)
2019–20 Radivoj Korać Cup
2019–20 ABA League First Division
2019–20 ABA League Second Division
2019–20 First Women's Basketball League of Serbia

References

External links
 Official website 
 League at srbijasport.net

Basketball League of Serbia seasons
Serbia
Basketball
Serbia